Reinaldo Conrad (born 31 May 1942) is a Brazilian sailor. He won a bronze medal in the Flying Dutchman Class at the 1968 Summer Olympics and the 1976 Summer Olympics.

Reinaldo Conrad was also champion of the 1959 Pan American Games (with Antonio Barros) and of the 1963 Pan American Games (with his brother Ralph Conrad) in Snipe, as well as champion of the 1975 Pan American Games and 2nd of the 1967 Pan American Games (with Burkhard Cordes) in Flying Dutchman. He also won the Snipe Western Hemisphere & Orient Championship with his brother, Ralph Conrad, in 1962 and 1964, and was second at the Worlds in 1969 with Mário Buckup as his crew.

References

 Profile at sports-reference.com

External links
 
 
 
 

1942 births
Living people
Sportspeople from São Paulo
Brazilian male sailors (sport)
Sailors at the 1960 Summer Olympics – Finn
Sailors at the 1968 Summer Olympics – Flying Dutchman
Sailors at the 1972 Summer Olympics – Flying Dutchman
Sailors at the 1976 Summer Olympics – Flying Dutchman
Sailors at the 1980 Summer Olympics – Flying Dutchman
Olympic sailors of Brazil
Olympic bronze medalists for Brazil
Olympic medalists in sailing
Snipe class sailors
Soling class sailors
Medalists at the 1976 Summer Olympics
Medalists at the 1968 Summer Olympics
Place of birth missing (living people)
Pan American Games medalists in sailing
Pan American Games gold medalists for Brazil
Sailors at the 1959 Pan American Games
Sailors at the 1963 Pan American Games
Sailors at the 1967 Pan American Games
Sailors at the 1975 Pan American Games
Pan American Games silver medalists for Brazil
Medalists at the 1959 Pan American Games
Medalists at the 1963 Pan American Games
Medalists at the 1967 Pan American Games
Medalists at the 1975 Pan American Games
20th-century Brazilian people